Fakfak Mountains are located on Bomberai Peninsula to the north  of Fakfak in West Papua province, Indonesia.

Geography 
Topography includes the following top elevations in Fakfak Mountains: 
Baham at 613 m (coordinates 3.0719 ° S 132.6935 ° E )
Gunung Weri at 537 m (coordinates 3.2098 ° S 132.7128 ° E )
Patimun at 499 m (coordinates 3.0444 ° S 132.5228 ° E )
Samai at 980 m (coordinates 3.1118 ° S 132.6206 ° E )

Flora and fauna
Fauna of the Fakfak Mountains includes the black-eared catbird and Oninia senglaubi, a member of the family of the narrow-mouthed frogs (Microhylidae).

Bird species recorded at FakFak Mountains:
Papuan Eagle
Papuan Pitta
Vogelkop Bowerbird
Black Berrypecker
Little Shrikethrush
Greater Melampitta
Banded Yellow Robin
Olive Flyrobin
Island Leaf Warbler
Capped White-eye
Fairy lorikeet

Climate 
Tropical rainforest climate  prevails in the area.  The annual average temperature in the funnel is 20 °C.  The hottest month is November, when the average temperature is 21 °C, and the coldest is June, with 18 °C.   The average annual rainfall is 3 217 millimeters.  The rainy month is June, with an average of 438 mm rainfall, and the driest is October, with 167 mm rainfall.

References 

Mountain ranges of Western New Guinea
Geography of New Guinea